A Broadband Imaging X-ray All-sky Survey, or ABRIXAS was a space-based German X-ray telescope. It was launched on 28 April 1999 in a Kosmos-3M launch vehicle from Kapustin Yar, Russia, into Earth orbit.

The telescope's battery was accidentally overcharged and destroyed three days after the mission started. When attempts to communicate with the satellite — while its solar panels were illuminated by sunlight — failed, the $20 million project was abandoned. ABRIXAS decayed from orbit on 31 October 2017.

The eROSITA telescope is based on the design of the ABRIXAS observatory. eROSITA was launched on board the Spektr-RG space observatory on 13 July 2019 from Baikonur to be deployed at the second Lagrange point (L2).

See also 

 German space programme

References 

Gamma-ray telescopes
Space telescopes
1999 in spaceflight
Satellites of Germany
Spacecraft launched in 1999